Karpathos, also Carpathos, is the second largest of the Greek Dodecanese islands, in the southeastern Aegean Sea. Together with the neighboring smaller Saria Island it forms the municipality of Karpathos, which is part of the Karpathos regional unit. Because of its remote location, Karpathos has preserved many peculiarities of dress, customs and dialect, the last resembling those of Crete and Cyprus. The island has also been called Carpathus in Latin and Scarpanto in Italian.

Etymology 
Homer calls the island Krapathos, with metathesis of two letters in the first syllable. Other names of the island include Tetrapolis and Anemoessa.

Geography

The Sea of Crete, a sub-basin of the Mediterranean Sea, has its eastern limit defined by the island of Karpathos. Karpathos comprises 11 villages. Pigadia (official name Karpathos), the capital and main port of the island, is located in the southeast of the island. The capital is surrounded by the villages of Menetes, Arkasa, Finiki, Pyles, Othos, Volada and Aperi. The villages of Mesochori and Spoa are located in central Karpathos while Olympos and the second port of Karpathos Diafani are in the north.

The island Saria was once united with Karpathos, but an earthquake divided them. Saria preserves many important antiquities.

Climate

Municipality

The present municipality Karpathos was formed at the 2011 local government reform by the merger of the following 2 former municipalities, that became municipal units:
 Karpathos
 Olympos

The municipality has an area of 324.800 km2, the municipal unit 219.924 km2.

Mythology 
Karpathos is the mithological homeland of the Titan Iapetus, and the birthplace of Proteus.

History

The island of Karpathos was in both ancient and medieval times closely connected with Rhodes. Its current name is mentioned, with a slight shift of one letter, in Homer's Iliad as Krapathos. Apollonius of Rhodes, in his epic Argonautica, made it a port of call for the Argonauts travelling between Libya and Crete. The island is also mentioned by Diodorus who claims it was a colony of the Dorians, Pomponius Mela, Pliny the Elder, and Strabo.

The Karpathians sided with Sparta in the Peloponnesian War in 431 BCE and lost their independence to Rhodes in 400 BCE. In 42 BCE, the island fell to Rome. After the division of the Roman Empire in 395 CE, the island became part of the Byzantine Empire.

Of its Christian bishops, the names are known of Olympius, who was a supporter of Nestorius, Zoticus (in 518), Mennas (in 553), Ioannes, Leo (in 787), and Philippus (in 879). In the 14th century, the island was a see of the Latin Church, four of whose bishops bore the name Nicolaus. No longer a residential bishopric, Karpathos (in Latin Carpathus) is today listed by the Catholic Church as an archiepiscopal titular see.

In 1304, Karpathos was given as fief to the Genoese corsairs Andrea and Lodovico Moresco, but in 1306 it fell to Andrea Cornaro, a member of the Venetian Cornaro family. The Cornaro controlled Karpathos until 1538, when it passed into the possession of the Ottoman Turks.

During the Greek War of Independence from 1821 to 1822, the island rebelled, but afterwards it fell again under Ottoman rule. In 1835, Sultan Mahmud II conceded to the island the privilege of the maktu tax system; that is, the tax was calculated as an annual lump sum, and not on a household basis. The Ottoman rule ended on 12 May 1912, when the Italians occupied the island and the rest of the Dodecanese, during the Italo-Turkish War of 1911–12. On that day, sailors from the Regia Marina battleship Vittorio Emanuele and the destroyer Alpino landed in Karpathos. With the Treaty of Lausanne (1923), Karpathos joined the other islands of the Dodecanese in the Italian possession of the Italian Aegean Islands. The Italians occupied the island until September 1943, when Italy surrendered. Afterwards, Karpathos was occupied by German forces, who eventually left the island on 4 October 1944. The island was ceded by Italy to Greece with the Paris Peace Treaties of 1947. The island formally joined the Kingdom of Greece on 7 March 1948, together with the other Dodecanese islands.

In the late 1940s and 1950s, due to the economic problems after World War II, a number of Karpathians emigrated to the U.S. eastern seaboard cities; Karpathos today has a significant Greek-American constituency who have returned to their island and invested heavily. Inhabitants of the mountains to the north are more traditional.

Transportation

Karpathos Island National Airport, with its relatively large runway, is located on the south side (Afiartis area). Karpathos is connected to neighboring islands and to the mainland via ferries and airplanes. The ferries provide transport to and from Piraeus (via Crete and Rhodes). Scheduled domestic flights connect the island with Rhodes, Kasos, Crete and Athens daily. Additionally, charter flights from various European cities are frequently scheduled during the high season (April–October).

Within the island, cars are the preferred mode of transportation. The port, the airport, the main villages and other popular locations are connected by an adequate system of municipal roads, most of which are paved. During the summer months, small private boats depart from Pigadia to various locations daily, including Olympos (via Diafani) and some inaccessible beaches. Fixed-rate taxis (agoraia) and municipal buses are also available all year long.

Population
The island's 2011 census population was 6,226 inhabitants. This number more than doubles in the summer months as many Karpathian expatriates come to the island for their vacation with their families. Also, taking into consideration the number of tourists that visit, there can be up to 20,000 people on the island during the summer months. The population density is greatest during the 15th of August due to the Panagias festival (Assumption of Mary), which is considered the most important festival on the island. Individuals travel from around the world to attend the festival and view the many traditions that still remain on the island.

Census

Beaches 

The beaches of Karpathos island can be divided into four large groups: the beaches on the east coast are smaller and gravelly but without wind; the beaches of the southern part of the island, near the airport, are made of fine white sand; the sandy beaches on the west coast are the most exposed to the Meltemi and they are only available in low wind conditions; the beaches of the north of the island are accessible only by sea and partly by jeep.
 East coast: Amoopi, Karpathos Beach (Vrontis), Achata, Kato Latos (reachable only on foot), Kyra Panagia, Apella, Agios Nikolaos (Spoa).
 South coast: Mihaliou o Kipos, Damatria, Diakoftis, Devils Bay, Agrilaopotamos (nude beach), Pounta beach. 
 West coast: Lefkos beach, Mesohori, Finiki, Arkasa Leucadius.
 North coast: Diafani, Alimounta (Saria island), Palatia (Saria island), Kalamia, Vananda, Apokapos (or Papa-Mina), Opsi, Kantri, Forokli, Kapi, Nati, Philios (or Agios Minas), Agnontia.

See also
 List of traditional Greek place names

Notes

Sources

External links

 Karpathos Hotel Association
 Independent website for Karpathos
 Karpathian Association Australia
  Ιndependent website for North Karpathos

Islands of Greece
Dodecanese
Municipalities of the South Aegean
Landforms of Karpathos (regional unit)
Islands of the South Aegean
Dorian colonies
Populated places in the ancient Aegean islands
Populated places in Karpathos (regional unit)